Gun show loophole is a political term in the United States referring to the sale of firearms by private sellers, including those done at gun shows, that do not require the seller to conduct a federal background check of the buyer.
This is also called the private sale exemption. Under federal law, any person may sell a firearm to a federally unlicensed resident of the state where they reside, as long as they do not know or have reasonable cause to believe that the person is prohibited from receiving or possessing firearms.

Under federal law, for sales of firearms by holders of a Federal Firearms License (FFL), such as gun stores, pawn shops, outdoors stores and other licensees, the seller must perform a background check of the buyer, and record the sale, regardless of whether the sale takes place at the seller's regular place of business or at a gun show. Firearm sales between private individuals who reside in the same state – that is, sales in the "secondary market" – are exempt from these requirements. For private sales, under federal law any unlicensed person may sell a firearm to an unlicensed resident of the same state as long as the seller does not know or have reasonable cause to believe that the purchaser is prohibited from receiving or possessing firearms under federal law.

Twenty-two states and the District of Columbia have laws that require background checks for some or all private sales, including sales at gun shows. In some of these states, such non-commercial sales also must be facilitated through a federally licensed dealer, who performs the background check and records the sale. In other states, gun buyers must first obtain a license or permit from the state, which performs a background check before issuing the license (thus typically not requiring a duplicative background check from a gun dealer).

Since the mid-1990s, gun control advocates have campaigned for universal background checks. Advocates for gun rights have stated that there is no loophole, that current laws provide a single, uniform set of rules for commercial gun sellers regardless of the place of sale, and that the United States Constitution, specifically the Commerce Clause, does not empower the federal government to regulate non-commercial, intrastate transfers of legal firearms between private citizens.

Provenance

Sometimes referred to as the Brady bill loophole, the Brady law loophole, the gun law loophole, or the private sale loophole, the term refers to a perceived gap in laws that address what types of sales and transfers of firearms require records and or background checks, such as the Brady Handgun Violence Prevention Act. Private parties are not legally required by federal law to: ask for identification, complete any forms, or keep any sales records, as long as the sale is not made in interstate commerce (across state lines) and does not fall under purview of the National Firearms Act. In addition to federal legislation, firearm laws vary by state.

Federal "gun show loophole" bills were introduced in seven consecutive Congresses: two in 2001, two in 2004, one in 2005, one in 2007, two in 2009, two in 2011, and one in 2013. Specifically, seven gun show "loophole" bills were introduced in the U.S. House and four in the Senate between 2001 and 2013. None passed. In May 2015 Carolyn Maloney introduced H.R.2380, also referred to as the Gun Show Loophole Closing Act of 2015. As of June 26 it has been referred to the Subcommittee on Crime, Terrorism, Homeland Security, and Investigations. In March 2017, representative Maloney also introduced H.R.1612, referred to as the Gun Show Loophole Closing Act of 2017. In January 2019 she sponsored H.R.820 - Gun Show Loophole Closing Act of 2019.

States requiring background checks for private sales

A number of states have background check requirements beyond federal law. Some states require universal background checks at the point of sale for all transfers, including purchases from unlicensed sellers. Maryland, Pennsylvania, Michigan, Nebraska, and North Carolina laws in this regard are limited to handguns. Hawaii, Illinois, Massachusetts and New Jersey require any firearm purchaser to obtain a permit. (Illinois formerly required the permit to be verified with the state police only at gun shows, but in 2013 the law was changed to require verification for all private sales.) Vermont passed new gun control laws in 2018, one of which requires background checks for private sales. Nevada's revised law went into effect in 2020. Virginia also started requiring background checks in 2020.

A majority of these jurisdictions require unlicensed sellers to keep records of firearm sales.

Some local counties have adopted Second Amendment sanctuary resolutions in opposition to universal background check laws.

The following table summarizes these state laws.

Notes:
 Effective July 1, 2023, private sales of firearms must be done through a gun dealer with a Federal Firearms License (FFL).

History
In 1968, Congress passed the Gun Control Act (GCA), under which modern firearm commerce operates. The GCA mandated Federal Firearms Licenses (FFLs) for those "engaged in the business" of selling firearms, but not for private individuals who sold firearms infrequently. Under the Gun Control Act, firearm dealers were prohibited from doing business anywhere except the address listed on their Federal Firearms License. It also mandated that licensed firearm dealers maintain records of firearms sales. An unlicensed person is prohibited by federal law from transferring, selling, trading, giving, transporting, or delivering a firearm to any other unlicensed person only if they know or have reasonable cause to believe the buyer does not reside in the same State or is prohibited by law from purchasing or possessing firearms.

In 1986, Congress passed the Firearm Owners Protection Act (FOPA), which relaxed certain controls in the Gun Control Act and permitted licensed firearm dealers to conduct business at gun shows. Specifically, FOPA made it legal for FFL holders to make private sales, provided the firearm was transferred to the licensee's personal collection at least one year prior to the sale. Hence, when a personal firearm is sold by an FFL holder, no background check or Form 4473 is required by federal law. According to the ATF, FFL holders are required to keep a record of such sales in a bound book. The United States Department of Justice (USDOJ) said the stated purpose of FOPA was to ensure the GCA did not "place any undue or unnecessary federal restrictions or burdens on law-abiding citizens, but it opened many loopholes through which illegal gun traffickers can slip." The scope of those who "engage in the business" of dealing in firearms (and are therefore required to have a license) was narrowed to include only those who devote "time, attention, and labor to dealing in firearms as a regular course of trade or business with the principal objective of livelihood and profit through the repetitive purchase and resale of firearms." FOPA excluded those who buy and sell firearms to "enhance a personal collection" or for a "hobby," or who "sell all or part of a personal collection." According to the USDOJ, this new definition made it difficult for them to identify offenders who could claim they were operating as "hobbyists" trading firearms from their personal collection. Efforts to reverse a key feature of FOPA by requiring criminal background checks and purchase records on private sales at gun shows were unsuccessful. Those who sold only at gun shows and wanted to obtain an FFL, which would allow them to conduct background checks, were prohibited from doing so through question 18a on the ATF Form 7 (Application for Federal Firearms License). The April 2019 revision of the Form 7 removed this restriction, allowing them to obtain licenses.

In 1993, Congress enacted the Brady Handgun Violence Prevention Act, amending the Gun Control Act of 1968. "The Brady Law" instituted federal background checks on all firearm purchasers who buy from federally licensed dealers (FFL). This law had no provisions for private firearms transactions or sales. The Brady Law originally imposed an interim measure, requiring a waiting period of 5 days before a licensed importer, manufacturer, or dealer may sell, deliver, or transfer a handgun to an unlicensed individual. The waiting period applied only in states without an alternate system that was deemed acceptable of conducting background checks on handgun purchasers. Personal transfers and sales between unlicensed Americans could also still be subject to other federal, state, and local restrictions. These interim provisions ceased to apply on November 30, 1998.

Government studies and positions
Firearm tracing starts at the manufacturer or importer and typically ends at the first private sale regardless if the private seller later sells to an FFL or uses an FFL for background checks. Analyzing data from a report released in 1997 by the National Institute of Justice, fewer than 2% of convicted criminals bought their firearm at a flea market or gun show. About 12% purchased their firearm from a retail store or pawnshop, and 80% bought from family, friends, or an illegal source. An additional study performed by the Bureau of Justice Statistics, published in January 2019, found that fewer than 1% of criminals obtained a firearm at a gun show (0.8%).

Under Chapter 18 Section 922 of the United States Code it is unlawful for any person "except a licensed importer, licensed manufacturer, or licensed dealer, to engage in the business of importing, manufacturing, or dealing in firearms."

The federal government provides a specific definition of what a firearm dealer is. Under Chapter 18 Section 921(a)(11), a dealer is...

(A) any person engaged in the business of selling firearms at wholesale or retail, (B) any person engaged in the business of repairing firearms or of making or fitting special barrels, stocks, or trigger mechanisms to firearms, or (C) any person who is a pawnbroker.

According to a 1999 report by the ATF, legal private party transactions contribute to illegal activities, such as arms trafficking, purchases of firearms by prohibited buyers, and straw purchases. Anyone selling a firearm is legally prohibited from selling it to anyone the seller knows or has reasonable cause to believe is prohibited from owning a firearm. FFL holders, in general, can only transfer firearms to a non-licensed individual if that individual resides in the state where the FFL holder is licensed to do business, and only at that place of business or a gun show in their state.

The January 1999 report said that more than 4,000 gun shows are held in the U.S. annually. Also, between 50 and 75 percent of gun show vendors hold a Federal Firearms License, and the "majority of vendors who attend shows sell firearms, associated accessories, and other paraphernalia." The report concluded that although most sellers at gun shows are upstanding people, a few corrupt sellers could move a large quantity of firearms into high-risk hands. They stated that there were gaps in current law and recommended "extending the Brady Law to 'close the gun show loophole.'"

In 2009 the U.S. Government Accountability Office published a report citing that many firearms trafficked to 
Mexico may be purchased through these types of private transactions, by individuals who may want to avoid background checks and records of their firearms purchases.
Proposals put forth by United States Attorneys, which were never enacted, include: 
 Allowing only FFL holders to sell guns at gun shows, so a background check and a firearms transaction record accompany every transaction
 Strengthening the definition of "engaged in the business" by defining the terms with more precision, narrowing the exception for "hobbyists," and lowering the intent requirement
 Limiting the number of individual private sales to a specified number per year
 Requiring persons who sell guns in the secondary market to comply with the record-keeping requirements applicable to Federal Firearms License holders
 Requiring all transfers in the secondary market to go through a Federal Firearms License holder
 Establishing procedures for the orderly liquidation of inventory belonging to FFL holders who surrender their license
 Requiring registration of non-licensed persons who sell guns
 Increasing the punishment for transferring a firearm without a background check, as required by the Brady Act
 Requiring gun show promoters to be licensed, maintaining an inventory of all the firearms that are sold by FFL holders and non-licensed sellers at gun shows
 Requiring one or more ATF agents be present at every gun show
 Insulating unlicensed vendors from criminal liability if they agree to have purchasers complete a firearms transaction form

Executive branch
On November 6, 1998, U.S. President Bill Clinton issued a memorandum for the Secretary of the Treasury and the Attorney General expressing concern about sellers at gun shows not being required to run background checks on potential buyers. He called this absence a "loophole" and said that it made gun shows prime targets for criminals and gun traffickers. He requested recommendations on what actions the administration should take, including legislation.

During his campaign and presidency, President George W. Bush endorsed the idea of background checks at gun shows. Bush's position was that the gun show loophole should be closed by federal legislation since the gun show loophole was created by previous federal legislation. President Bush ordered an investigation by the U.S. Departments of Health, Education, and Justice in the wake of the Virginia Tech shootings in order to make recommendations on ways the federal government can prevent such tragedies. On January 8, 2008 he signed the NICS Improvement Amendments Act of 2007 (NIAA) into law. Goals and objectives that the NIAA sought to address included: The gap in information available to NICS about such prohibiting mental health adjudications and commitments. Filling these information gaps will better enable the system to operate as intended, to keep guns out of the hands of persons prohibited by federal or state law from receiving or possessing firearms.

At the beginning of 2013, President Barack Obama outlined proposals regarding new gun control legislation asking Congress to close the gun show loophole by requiring background checks for all firearm sales. Closing the gun show loophole became part of a larger push for universal background checks to close "federal loopholes on such checks at gun shows and other private sales."

After the 2019 Dayton shooting and 2019 El Paso shooting President Donald Trump expressed an interest in tighter background checks for gun purchases. He later tweeted... 

In the wake of the March 2021 Boulder shooting President Joe Biden said at a press conference that the US Senate should pass legislation, namely H.R. 8 and H.R. 1446, to close loopholes in background checks required for purchasing firearms. In April 2021, the District Attorney for Boulder, CO. concluded the defendant had passed a background check and legally purchased weapons and ammo six days prior to the attack. Possession of high-capacity magazines, such as the ones found in the defendant's car, were banned in Colorado after 2013, in response to previous mass shootings. By December 2021, a judge in the case declared the accused as mentally incompetent to stand trial and ordered them to receive treatment at a state mental hospital.

Notable opinions

In 1996, the Violence Policy Center (VPC) released Gun Shows in America: Tupperware® Parties for Criminals, a study that identified problems associated with gun shows. The VPC study documented the effect of the 1986 Firearms Owners' Protection Act in regard to proliferation of gun shows, which resulted in "a readily available source of weapons and ammunition for a wide variety of criminals, as well as Timothy McVeigh and David Koresh". According to the VPC, the utility of gun shows to dangerous individuals stems primarily from the exemption enjoyed by private sellers from the sales criteria of the Brady law as well as the absence of a background check. The director of the program which is located at the UC Davis, Garen J. Wintemute, wrote, "There is no such loophole in federal law, in the limited sense that the law does not exempt private-party sales at gun shows from regulation that is required elsewhere." Wintemute said, The fundamental flaw in the gun show loophole proposal is its failure to address the great majority of private-party sales, which occur at other locations and increasingly over the Internet at sites where any non-prohibited person can list firearms for sale and buyers can search for private-party sellers.

On May 27, 1999 Wayne LaPierre, executive vice president of the National Rifle Association (NRA), testified before the House Judiciary Subcommittee on Crime, saying: "We think it is reasonable to provide mandatory, instant criminal background checks for every sale at every gun show. No loopholes anywhere for anyone." LaPierre has since said that he is opposed to universal background checks.

In 1999, Dave Kopel, attorney and gun rights advocate for the NRA, said: "gun shows are no 'loophole' in the federal laws," and that singling out gun shows was "the first step toward abolishing all privacy regarding firearms and implementing universal gun registration." In January 2000, Kopel said that no proposed federal law would have made any difference at Columbine since the adults who supplied the weapons were legal purchasers.

In 2009, Nicholas J. Johnson of the Fordham University School of Law, wrote:
Criticisms of the "gun show loophole" imply that federal regulations allow otherwise prohibited retail purchases ("primary market sales") of firearms at gun shows. This implication is false. The real criticism is leveled at secondary market sales by private citizens.

In 2010, the Brady Campaign to Prevent Gun Violence said: "Because of the gun show loophole, in most states prohibited buyers can walk into any gun show and buy weapons from unlicensed sellers with no background check. Many of these gun sellers operate week-to-week with no established place of business, traveling from gun show to gun show."

In 2013, the NRA said that a universal background check system for gun buyers is both impracticable and unnecessary, but an effective instant check system that includes records of persons adjudicated mentally ill would prevent potentially dangerous people from getting their hands on firearms. The group argues that only 10 percent of firearms are purchased via private sellers. They also dispute the idea that the current law amounts to a gun-show loophole, pointing out that many of the people selling at gun shows are federally licensed dealers. The group has stated in the past that: gun control supporters' objectives are to reduce gun sales and register guns, and that there is no "loophole," but legal commerce under the status quo (like book fairs or car shows).

In 2016, a study published in The Lancet reported that state laws only requiring background checks or permits for gun sales at gun shows were associated with higher rates of gun-related deaths. The same study also found that state laws that required background checks for all gun sales were strongly associated with lower rates of gun-related deaths. Also that year Gabriel J. Chin, professor at UC Davis School of Law, stated that since there are no clear stipulations for the number of firearms sold before someone is required to be federally licensed and that since gun shows are usually held on weekends, "there is room for someone to claim 'this is a hobby or part of my collection' when it is also a substantial business."

Closing the gun show loophole through universal background checks enjoys high levels of public support.

In 2016, PolitiFact published an article in which several experts stated that the phrase "gun show loophole" isn't the most accurate way to describe the law.

State-level pro-gun lobbies oppose the framing of the issue, claiming that gun control schemes such as closing the gun show loophole, "criminalizes the right to buy and sell lawful private property. Numerous studies and analyses indicate that there is no such thing as a 'gun show loophole.' It's merely slick marketing to scare people into supporting an assault on private property, gun owners and gun ownership." In 2021, Wisconsin Gun Owners, Inc., a Second Amendment lobbying organization, opposed a ban on Wisconsin gun shows it argued was unjustified by statistics or research and amounted to discrimination against gun owners.

Contributing events
After the Columbine High School massacre on April 20, 1999, gun shows and background checks became a focus of national debate in the United States, despite the fact that the shooters had not attended a gun show and had instead obtained them from a friend who had purchased the guns legally. Weeks after the Columbine shooting, Frank Lautenberg introduced a proposal to close the gun show loophole in federal law. It was passed in the Senate, but did not pass in the House.

The Virginia Tech shooting on April 16, 2007 again brought discussion of the gun show loophole to the forefront of U.S. politics, even though the shooter passed a background check and purchased his weapons legally at a Virginia gun shop via a Wisconsin-based Internet dealer. Previously, in December 2005, a Virginia judge had directed the Virginia Tech gunman to undergo outpatient treatment, but because he was treated as an outpatient, Virginia did not send his name to the National Instant Criminal Background Check System (NICS). On April 30, 2007, Tim Kaine, the Governor of Virginia, issued an executive order intended to prohibit the sale of guns to anyone found to be dangerous and forced to undergo involuntary mental health treatment. He called on lawmakers to close the gun show loophole. A bill to close the gun show loophole in Virginia was submitted, but eventually failed. Since then, Virginia lawmakers' efforts to close the gun show loophole were continuously blocked by gun rights advocates. The Governor wrote:

After the July 2012 Aurora, Colorado shooting in Colorado, the October 2012 Azana Spa shooting in Wisconsin, and the December 2012 Sandy Hook Elementary School shooting in Connecticut, state and local debates regarding the gun show loophole resumed. After the Aurora shooting, then president of the NRA, David Keene, said that such tragedies are often exploited by the media and politicians. He said, "Colorado has already closed the so-called 'loophole' and the killer didn't buy his guns at a gun show." The handgun in the Azana Spa shooting was purchased legally in a private transaction, not at a gun show. The Sandy Hook shooter used weapons legally purchased and owned by his mother.

See also
 Gun Show Loophole Closing Act of 2009
 John Lott
 Universal background check

Notes

References

Further reading
 
 
 
 
 
 
 
 
  - Patrick, a professor of communication at the University of Toledo, thinks "gun show loophole" is a euphemistic label for legislative proposals as part of an "overall disarmament goal."

Gun politics in the United States
United States federal firearms legislation